Brachyglottis monroi (Monro's ragwort; syn. Senecio monroi) is a species of plant in the family Asteraceae, formerly classified in the genus Senecio.

References

monroi
Plants described in 1855
Flora of New Zealand
Flora of Tasmania